EGN may refer to:
 Eagle Aviation France, a defunct French airline
 Eastrington railway station, in England
 EGN Australia, an online computer games network
 Erie Gay News, a newsletter in Erie, Pennsylvania
 Ergative-genitive case
 European Geoparks Network
 Geneina Airport, in Sudan
 Uniform civil number, a Bulgarian administrative identification number